Lost is an American drama series that aired on ABC from September 22, 2004 until May 23, 2010. It was nominated for numerous awards, including 54 Primetime Emmy Awards (11 wins), 54 Saturn Awards (13 wins), 33 Teen Choice Awards, 17 TCA Awards (4 wins), 13 Golden Reel Awards (5 wins), 8 Satellite Awards (1 win), 7 Golden Globe Awards (1 win), 7 Writers Guild of America Awards (1 win), 6 Directors Guild of America Awards, 6 Producers Guild of America Awards (1 win), 4 People's Choice Awards, 2 BAFTA TV Awards, 2 NAACP Image Awards (1 win), and 2 Screen Actors Guild Awards (1 win). Amongst the wins for the series are the Primetime Emmy Award for Outstanding Drama Series (1 win), Golden Globe Award for Best Television Series – Drama (1 win), Screen Actors Guild Award for Outstanding Performance by an Ensemble in a Drama Series (1 win), Saturn Award for Best Network Television Series (5 wins), TCA Award for Outstanding Achievement in Drama (3 wins), and Peabody Award (1 win).

The series has an ensemble cast and several different Lost actors have received acting award nominations. Michael Emerson and Terry O'Quinn are the only actors to win Primetime Emmy Awards. Matthew Fox has been nominated for 19 individual awards (winning three), the most of any cast member; Evangeline Lilly is second with 16 and Emerson is third with 13 (winning two). "Pilot" is the most nominated episode of the series, receiving nominations from fifteen different associations; the episode won eight awards, including four Primetime Emmy Awards. The third season finale, "Through the Looking Glass", is the second most nominated episode with nine while "The End" received the most Primetime Emmy Award nominations with eight, winning one.

Emmy Awards

In 2005, Lost was nominated for twelve Primetime Emmy Awards and won six, including Outstanding Drama Series, which was considered an unusual win since the Primetime Emmy Awards had rarely recognized science fiction or fantasy programs. It also won Outstanding Directing for a Drama Series for co-creator J. J. Abrams (for his direction on the pilot episode), Outstanding Casting for a Drama Series, and three additional awards for the pilot episode. The following year, the series was nominated for nine awards, but failed to win any. Despite winning for Outstanding Drama Series the previous year, Lost was not nominated in 2006. This was referenced in host Conan O'Brien's opening segment at the 58th Primetime Emmy Awards; he lands on a beach and encounters Jorge Garcia. O'Brien jumps into a hatch and invites Garcia to come along to the ceremony, but Garcia tells him that they "weren't exactly invited", to which O'Brien responds by saying "Really? But you won last year! Nothing makes sense anymore!" In 2007, the series was nominated for six awards, but again failed to gain a nomination for Outstanding Drama Series. Additionally, Terry O'Quinn became the first Lost actor to win a Primetime Emmy Award, picking up the award for Outstanding Supporting Actor in a Drama Series for his performance as John Locke in "The Man from Tallahassee" (season 3, episode 13). In 2008, the series received eight nominations, including Outstanding Drama Series after being snubbed the two previous years; the season only won Outstanding Sound Mixing for a Comedy or Drama Series (One-Hour) for "Meet Kevin Johnson" (season 4, episode 8). In 2009, the series received six nominations and won two; Michael Emerson became the second actor from Lost to win a Primetime Emmy Award, winning for Outstanding Supporting Actor in a Drama Series for his performance as Ben Linus in "Dead Is Dead" (season 5, episode 12). The website DharmaWantsYou.com won a special award for Outstanding Creative Achievement in Interactive Media – Fiction. In 2010, the sixth and final season of Lost received thirteen nominations, including a fourth and final nomination for Outstanding Drama Series, which it lost to season 3 of Mad Men, as in the two previous years. The season only won Outstanding Single-Camera Picture Editing for a Drama Series for the finale.

Primetime Emmy Awards

Creative Arts Emmy Awards

Directors Guild of America Awards

The Directors Guild of America Awards are issued annually by the Directors Guild of America. Lost has been nominated six times for Outstanding Directorial Achievement in Dramatic Series, but failed to win any.

Golden Globe Awards

Lost was nominated for Best Television Series – Drama at the Hollywood Foreign Press Association's annual Golden Globe Awards three straight years in 2005, 2006 and 2007, winning in 2006. Naveen Andrews, Michael Emerson, Matthew Fox, and Evangeline Lilly have all received nominations for acting.

Golden Reel Awards
The Golden Reel Awards are presented annually by the Motion Picture Sound Editors. Lost has been nominated in various categories thirteen times, winning five.

Satellite Awards
The Satellite Awards, originally known as the Golden Satellite Awards, are annually given by the International Press Academy, which is commonly noted in entertainment industry journals and blogs. Lost has won one award, which went to Matthew Fox for Best Actor in a Series – Drama in 2005.

Saturn Awards

The Saturn Awards are presented annually by the Academy of Science Fiction, Fantasy and Horror Films, which honors science fiction, fantasy and horror in film, television, and home video. Lost has been nominated for 54 awards and has won 13, including five wins for Best Network Television Series (2005–2006, 2008–2010) and acting wins for Michael Emerson (2008), Matthew Fox (2006, 2008), Josh Holloway (2010), Elizabeth Mitchell (2008), and Terry O'Quinn (2005).

TCA Awards
The TCA Awards are presented annually by the Television Critics Association in recognition of excellence in television. Lost has won four: Outstanding New Program in 2005 and Outstanding Achievement in Drama in 2005, 2006, and 2010.

Teen Choice Awards
The Teen Choice Awards are voted on by teenagers. Lost has been nominated for 33 awards, but has never won a single award. Evangeline Lilly has been nominated for eight awards and Matthew Fox has been nominated for seven, while Jorge Garcia and Josh Holloway have each been nominated for four.

Writers Guild of America Awards

The Writers Guild of America Awards are presented annually by the Writers Guild of America. Lost has been nominated four times for Dramatic Series, winning in 2006. The duos of Elizabeth Sarnoff & Christina M. Kim, Damon Lindelof & Drew Goddard, and Lindelof & Carlton Cuse have all received individual nominations.

Other awards
In 2005, the series and its ensemble were named "Entertainers of the Year" by Entertainment Weekly. In 2008, cast members Yunjin Kim and Daniel Dae Kim placed seventeenth on the list of the "25 Entertainers of the Year". Lost has had success at various guild and society awards, having been nominated for awards at a dozen ceremonies and winning eight. In 2007, Jack Bender, Carlton Cuse and Damon Lindelof won the Golden Nymph Award for Best Drama Series at the Monte-Carlo Television Festival. On April 1, 2009, it was announced that Lost had won a Peabody Award for "rewrit[ing] the rules of television fiction".

References

External links
 
 
 

Lost (TV series)
Lost